The acknowledgement of Lego in popular culture is demonstrated by the toy's wide representation in publication, television and film, and its common usage in artistic and cultural works.

Online
In 2001, Elbe Spurling started an online web project to create an illustrated version of the Bible using Lego bricks, called The Brick Testament. The project has grown to cover over 400 stories, with over 4000 images, each of which is a photograph of a hand-built Lego scene. The web project drew international media attention, and has been published as three hardcover books.

The search engine Google paid tribute to the 50th anniversary of the Lego patent by replacing its usual logo on the Google homepage with one made from Lego bricks, along with the Lego figure on one of the letters. Some of the hardware Google's founders had used during their early research was housed in custom-made enclosures constructed from Lego bricks.

There are also several online webcomics that feature art illustrated with Lego, such as  the Irregular Webcomic!, Brick House, Legostar Galactica, Tranquility Base, The Adventures of the S-Team, Brickworld Saga, Glomshire Knights, and Bricks of the Dead. Many of these webcomics make frequent jokes about the strange abbreviations, pet peeves and complaints often found in the LEGO community.

Books
Lego bricks played a role and were featured on some covers of Douglas Coupland's novel Microserfs published in June 1995.

Several unofficial books have been written about Lego. The Unofficial LEGO Builder's Guide was written by Allan Bedford, targeted at children, with the aim of teaching a variety of building techniques at various scales (including minifigure scale and Legoland 'Miniland' scale), as well as including a small encyclopedia of some of the most common different types of Lego brick available. Lego has also released some official Lego books, such as the Ultimate LEGO Book, in 1999.

There have also been many different books published about the Lego Mindstorms robotics product, some of which focus on its use as an educational toy within schools.

Films

There are a number of short movies or recreations of feature films that have been made using Lego bricks, either using stop motion animation or computer-generated imagery (CGI). Making these is a popular fan-activity, and is supported by community websites such as BrickFilms - these films are often known as Brickfilms Other examples include the award-winning music video for the song "Fell in Love with a Girl" by The White Stripes, in which director Michel Gondry filmed a live version of the video, digitized the result and then recreated it entirely with Lego bricks.

Lego and Miramax Films partnered to create a trilogy of direct-to-DVD films for Lego's highly popular Bionicle series. The films Bionicle: Mask of Light, Bionicle 2: Legends of Metru Nui and Bionicle 3: Web of Shadows were released between 2003 and 2005 respectively. A fourth film made in association with Universal was released in 2009 as Bionicle: The Legend Reborn.

A feature film based on Lego toys, The Lego Movie, was released in 2014 and became a critical and commercial success.

In 2017, The Lego Batman Movie, was released and featured popular characters based from the DC universe and featured other fictional characters from different universes such as Harry Potter, The Wizard of Oz, The Lord of the Rings, Gremlins and more.

A sequel to the 2014 film, The Lego Movie 2: The Second Part, was released in 2019 to least box-office success. The film introduced plotlines relating to Duplo, Lego's brand for younger children.

Music
In 1995–96, the Danish composer Frederik Magle composed a symphonic LEGO Fantasia in three movements for piano and symphony orchestra, commissioned by the Lego Group. The LEGO Fantasia was premiered on 24 August 1997 at a concert in St George's Chapel, Windsor Castle with the London Philharmonic Orchestra, David Parry and Frederik Magle. In 1998 the work was recorded by the same performers and released on a CD by the Lego group.

In 2002, the American rock band The White Stripes used Lego to produce an animated music video for their single Fell in Love with a Girl. The video was directed by Michel Gondry and won three MTV video music awards.

A 2011 pop song "Lego House" by British singer-songwriter Ed Sheeran has a reference to Lego in the name, even though Lego is only mentioned once in the beginning of the song as a metaphor for a breakup.

2014 song by Avicii "Addicted to You" remix video made out of Lego referencing the lobby scene from "The Matrix".

Art
Artists have used Lego to create artwork, which is sometimes referred to as Lego art or brick art.

twenty people in 2021, in all around the world, have become Lego Certified Professionals; certified artists that use Lego bricks as their medium. The Lego Group recognizes their efforts and they have the ability to not only use the Lego name and copyrighted logo, but have earned a special, in-depth relationship with the company. They are America; Robin Sather, Graeme Dymond, Nathan Sawaya; Europe & Middle East: Georg Schmitt, Matija Puzar,Rene Hoffmeister, Kevin Hall, Riccardo Zangelmi, Caspar Bennedsenand, Balazs Doczy, Vladimir Golubev; Asia-Pacific: Prince (Shenghui) Jiang, Jumpei Mitsui, Wani Kim, Jae Won Lee, Wei Wei Shannon Gluckman, Nicholas Foo, Yenchih Huang, Andy Hung and Ryan McNaught.

Lego bricks have been employed to replicate famous works of art in a mosaic motif, often for the promotion of a Lego event or relating to the replicated artwork. There have been many art-related records (especially mosaics) set by using Lego bricks. The largest Lego mosaic record was set on May 5-7th in 2012, consisting of over 660,000 pieces and measuring 143.91 sq. meters. It appears another world record attempt it under way to build a Lego mosaic of over 2,000,000 pieces as of January 2014.

A 2011 exhibition titled Da Vinci, The Genius at the Frazier History Museum in Louisville, Kentucky attracted attention by having a Brick Art Mona Lisa replica constructed by Lego artist Brian Korte.
Lego builders such as Eric Harshbarger have made multiple replicas of Mona Lisa.  
Matching the approximate 21 by 30 inch size (535 x 760+ mm) of Leonardo's original requires upwards of 5,000 standard Lego bricks, but replicas measuring 6 by 8 feet have been built, requiring more than 30,000 bricks.
The Little Artists (John Cake and Darren Neave) have created an entire Modern Art collection in Lego form. Their exhibition 'Art Craziest Nation'

was shown at the Walker Art Gallery in Liverpool, UK.

A giant legofigure called Ego Leonard washed ashore at several beaches in The Netherlands, UK and Siesta Key Florida 

Polish artist Zbigniew Libera created "Lego Concentration Camp", a collection of mock Lego sets with a concentration camp theme.

Danish artist Jørn Rønnau created a sculpture called The Walker out of 120,000 Lego bricks for the travelling exhibition 'Homo Futurus' at the end of the 1980s. The sculpture later went on display in the Danish pavilion at Expo 2000.
The Lego-Brücke (Lego Bridge) is situated in Wuppertal, Germany. It received an award in 2012.

In December 2013, Romanian Raul Oaida and Australian Steve Sammartino completed construction of a Lego Car.  The car is constructed of over half a million Lego pieces and runs on compressed air.

Television
Lego was the subject of Episode 5 of the 2009 British TV series James May's Toy Stories, in which presenter James May built a full-sized two-story house from 3.3 million Lego bricks in a vineyard of the Denbies Wine Estate in Dorking, Surrey. The house was later dismantled, as the space was needed for wine-making and the house lacked planning permission, and the bricks were taken to Legoland Windsor for use as part of an annual building event.

An episode of The Simpsons, "Hungry, Hungry Homer" involved the Simpsons family going to Blockoland, a parody of Legoland, which is completely made of blocks. Bart buys a T-shirt made of bricks, accidentally calling it a "Lego shirt" before Marge corrects him. Also during the scene, Lisa was seen with a model of the Eiffel Tower, which was released as an official set by LEGO in 2007. The most usage of LEGO on the show is in the Season 25 episode "Brick Like Me", where Springfield is made from LEGO bricks; it was actually Homer's dream. Also, during that scene, Bart comes out with a robot suit to save Homer from the evil Comic Book Guy, and the robot starts throwing up LEGO lightsabers.

Legoland is also mentioned in several episodes of the TV show Arrested Development.

In 2009, Lego was featured in an episode of MythBusters (Episode 117 - YouTube Special). The build team tested a myth related to a YouTube video that showed a ball of Lego being rolled down a street and into a car, where it caused major damage. The myth was declared busted when the ball started to lose pieces while being rolled down a hill and then smashed into thousands of pieces when it hit a barrier.

Lego was briefly seen in the intro for Happy Endings.

In the anime Shaman King, a character called Brocken Meyers body was crippled, and he subsequently wears a Lego like armor covering him from head to toe to help his disability; and creates various objects to battle with also seemingly made out of Lego (including a T-rex, bird, and tank.) Several other characters also have similar Lego like pieces on their bodies, although far less than Brocken.

Summer Brickathon
LEGO Summer Brickathon opened Memorial Day weekend 2012 at Broadway at the Beach in Myrtle Beach, South Carolina, and will return as a temporary attraction June 6 through July 17. Children and adults can build with Lego and have their picture taken. Other locations for the attraction have been Branson, Missouri; Lake Tahoe, California; and Traverse City, Michigan.

References

Popular culture
Topics in popular culture
Toy culture